520 West 28th Street, also known as the Zaha Hadid Building, is located in New York City. Designed by the architect Zaha Hadid, the building was her only residential building in New York and one of her last projects before her death. The building is located along the High Line. The building is set to have four art galleries located at street level. The building also has a sculpture platform with art curated by Friends of the High Line.

Exterior
The building features laser-cut stainless-steel trim that was fabricated and finished in Broomall, PA by M Cohen And Sons. Many of the apartments feature balconies. The building features curvilinear geometric motifs, a signature of Zaha Hadid Architects.

The building is L-shaped and has a duplex penthouse that is recessed from the rest of the building.
3D model of this building is available for download

Interior 
The building features model units were designed by Jennifer Post and West Chin. The units feature kitchens made by Boffi, which were designed by Zaha Hadid and Gaggenau Hausgeräte appliances. The bathrooms are fitted with smart glass. Lighting design for the interiors, including the lobby, amenities areas and select portions of the individual units, was done by Office for Visual Interaction.

Building amenities
Doorman
Pool
Sculpture garden
12-car automated garage
Private 3D IMAX screening room
Air filtration system

References

External links
 520 West 28th Street website

Condominiums and housing cooperatives in Manhattan
Zaha Hadid buildings
Residential buildings completed in 2017
Hudson Yards, Manhattan
Chelsea, Manhattan
Buildings developed by the Related Companies